LR&M Constructions is a South Australian construction and civil engineering company. It was established in Gawler in 1966 and is involved in construction projects in South Australia including part of the Northern Connector freeway.

It specialises in construction of housing developments, airport runways, wetlands and golf courses. It moved from Gawler to larger premises at Roseworthy in 2008.

The founding directors were Lionel Chamberlain, Ronald Chamberlain (otherwise better known to many by his second name of John), and Miriam Chamberlain.

References

Further reading

Construction and civil engineering companies of Australia
Companies based in South Australia
Family-owned companies of Australia
Construction and civil engineering companies established in 1966
Australian companies established in 1966